Roxette XXX – The 30 Biggest Hits is the sixth greatest hits compilation album by Swedish pop duo Roxette, released on 3 November 2014 by Roxette Recordings in conjunction with Parlophone and Warner Music Group.

Release
The compilation was released throughout the world in tandem with dates of "The Neverending World Tour". It was first released in Russia on 3 November 2014, the country in which the duo began the "XXX – The 30th Anniversary Tour" leg of "The Neverending World Tour". It was issued in other parts of the world as the tour progressed. The album consists of two CDs containing thirty songs, twenty-eight of which were released as commercial singles. The two remaining tracks were taken from their 1991 album Joyride, "Perfect Day" and "(Do You Get) Excited?". The latter had been issued as a promotional single in selected territories, peaking at number nine on the Spanish Airplay Chart in May 1992. Also included is a Bassflow remix of "The Sweet Hello, The Sad Goodbye", which was released as a non-album single in 2012. The original version of the track first appeared as a b-side on their 1991 single "Spending My Time".

Track listing
All songs written by Per Gessle, except "Spending My Time", "Queen of Rain", "Perfect Day", "Listen to Your Heart" and "(Do You Get) Excited?" by Gessle and Mats Persson, and "You Don't Understand Me" by Gessle and Desmond Child; all songs produced by Clarence Öfwerman, except where noted.

Notes
 signifies backing track co-production
 signifies remix and additional production

Personnel
Credits adapted from the liner notes of Roxette XXX – The 30 Biggest Hits.

 Roxette are Marie Fredriksson and Per Gessle
 Recorded at Tits & Ass Studio in Halmstad; X-Level Studios, Polar Studios, Audio Sweden and Atlantis Studios in Stockholm; The Aerosol Grey Machine in Vallarum, Scania; Mayfair Studios in London; El Cortijo Studios in Marbella, Spain; Capri Digital Studios in Capri, Italy between November 1987 and October 2010; "The Sweet Hello, The Sad Goodbye" reproduced and remixed at The Aerosol Grey Machine in Vallarum and Atlantis Studios in Stockholm in 2012.
 Compiled by Per Gessle.
 Mastered by Uffe Börjesson at Ear Hear Studio.

Musicians
 Marie Fredriksson – lead and background vocals; piano ; production and mixing
 Per Gessle – lead and background vocals; acoustic guitar ; electric guitar ; kazoo ; string arrangements ; whistling ; twelve-string acoustic guitar ; production and mixing
 Per "Pelle" Alsing – drums and hi-hat
 Micke "Nord" Andersson – twelve string acoustic and Rickenbacker guitars ; drums and tambourine ; acoustic guitar 
 Vicki Benckert – background vocals 
 Anders Herrlin – background vocals, bass guitar, engineering and programming
 Jonas Isacsson – electric and acoustic guitars; additional bass guitar ; harmonica 
 Christer Jansson – tom-toms and cymbals ; percussion ; cymbals ; drums ; drums, percussion and tambourine 
 Christoffer Lundquist – background vocals and extended-range bass ; bass and electric guitars ; background vocals ; background vocals and bass ; background vocals, bass, zither, tambourine and additional snare drum ; bass, guitars, keyboards, programming, engineering, production and mixing 
 Clarence Öfwerman – background vocals, keyboards, Synclavier ; string arrangements ; programming, production and mixing
 Staffan Öfwerman – percussion ; background vocals ; choir conducting 
 Mats "MP" Persson – engineering ; string arrangements ; electric and acoustic guitars ; drums ; keyboards and tremolo guitar ; electric guitar 
 Stockholm Session Strings – strings 
 Stockholms Nya Kammarorkester  – strings 
 Alar Suurna – tambourine ; engineering and mixing

 
Additional musicians
 Milla Andersson – background vocals 
 Magnus Blom – alto saxophone 
 Karla Collantes – choir 
 Hasse Dyvik – trumpet and flugelhorn 
 Bo Eriksson – oboe 
 Anders Evaldsson – trombone 
 Malin Gille – choir 
 Cecilia Grothén – choir 
 Henrik Janson – talkbox 
 Jarl "Jalle" Lorensson – harmonica 
 Paulina Nilsson – choir 
 Jackie Öfwerman – choir 
 Kjell Öhman – accordion 
 Jan "Janne" Oldaeus – slide guitar 
 Darina Rönn-Brolin – choir 
 Per "Pelle" Sirén – electric guitar 
 Sveriges Radios Symfoniorkester – woodwind quartet 

Technical
 Chris Lord-Alge – mixing 
 Humberto Gatica – mixing 
 Lennart Haglund – engineer 
 Mats Holmquist – string arrangements & conducting 
 Michael Ilbert – engineering, programming, string arrangements, production and mixing ; engineering ; engineering, production and mixing 
 Ronny Lahti – engineering, programming and mixing 
 Björn Norén – strings and horns recording engineer 
 Shooting Star – programming

Charts

Certifications

Release history

References

2014 greatest hits albums
Roxette compilation albums
Parlophone compilation albums